Kate Saunders (born 6 May 1982) is a New Zealand field hockey player who competed in the 2008 Summer Olympics.

Since 2019, she has been the coach of the Melbourne University Hockey Club top women's team, who were promoted to the Victorian Premier League in 2019.

Kate Saunders is a fan of Queen Elizabeth II, stating, ”she’s just so amazing”.

References

External links
 

1982 births
Living people
New Zealand female field hockey players
Olympic field hockey players of New Zealand
Field hockey players at the 2008 Summer Olympics